The National Administration of Power Plants and Electrical Transmissions, better known as UTE, is Uruguay's government-owned power company. It was established in 1912, following approval of Law 4273 establishing it as a monopoly.

In 1931 the monopoly on communications was also granted to UTE, until the founding of ANTEL in 1974.

In 1980 an organic law was passed.

See also
Electricity sector in Uruguay
Energy in Uruguay

References

External links
 Information about UTE in English

Electric power companies of Uruguay
Government-owned companies of Uruguay
Economy of Montevideo
Companies based in Montevideo
1912 establishments in Uruguay
Energy companies established in 1912
Public utilities established in 1912